Sanguinarine is a polycyclic quaternary alkaloid. It is extracted from some plants, including the bloodroot plant, from whose taxonomic name, Sanguinaria canadensis, its name is drawn; the Mexican prickly poppy (Argemone mexicana); Chelidonium majus; and Macleaya cordata.

Toxicity
Sanguinarine is a toxin that kills animal cells through its action on the Na+/K+-ATPase transmembrane protein.  Epidemic dropsy is a disease that results from ingesting sanguinarine.

If applied to the skin, sanguinarine may cause a massive scab of dead flesh where it killed the cells where it was applied, called an eschar.  For this reason, sanguinarine is termed an escharotic.

It is said to be 2.5 times more toxic than dihydrosanguinarine.

Alternative medicine 
Native Americans once used sanguinarine in the form of bloodroot as a medical remedy, believing it had curative properties as an emetic, respiratory aid, and for a variety of ailments. In Colonial America, sanguinarine from bloodroot was used as a wart remedy. Later, in 1869, William Cook's The Physiomedical Dispensatory included information on the preparation and uses of sanguinarine. During the 1920s and 1930s, sanguinarine was the chief component of "Pinkard's Sanguinaria Compound," a drug sold by Dr. John Henry Pinkard. Pinkard advertised the compound as "a treatment, remedy, and cure for pneumonia, coughs, weak lungs, asthma, kidney, liver, bladder, or any stomach troubles, and effective as a great blood and nerve tonic." In 1931, several samples of the compound were seized by federal officials who determined Pinkard's claims to be fraudulent. Pinkard pleaded guilty in court and accepted a fine of $25.00.

More recently, sanguinarine from bloodroot has been promoted by many alternative medicine companies as a treatment or cure for cancer; however, the U.S. Food and Drug Administration warns that products containing bloodroot, or other sanguinarine-based plants, have no proven anti-cancer effects, and that they should be avoided on those grounds. Meanwhile, Australian Therapeutic Goods Administration also advise consumers not to purchase or use products marketed as containing Sanguinaria canadensis to cure or treat cancer, including certain types of skin cancer. Indeed, oral use of such products has been associated with oral leukoplakia, a possible precursor of oral cancer. In addition, the escharotic form of sanguinarine, applied to the skin for skin cancers, may leave cancerous cells alive in the skin while creating a significant scar. For this reason it is not recommended as a skin cancer treatment.

Biosynthesis
In plants, sanguinarine biosynthesis begins with 4-hydroxyphenyl-acetaldehyde and dopamine. These two compounds are combined to form norcoclaurine. Next, methyl groups are added to form N-methylcoclaurine. The enzyme CYP80B1 subsequently adds a hydroxyl group, forming 3'-hydroxy-N-methylcoclaurine. The addition of another methyl group transforms this compound into reticuline.

Notably, biosynthesis of sanguinarine up to this point is virtually identical to that of morphine. However, instead of being converted to codeinone (as in the biosynthesis of morphine), reticuline is converted to scoulerine via berberine bridge enzyme (BBE). As such, this is the commitment step in the sanguinarine pathway. Although it is unknown exactly how scoulerine proceeds down the biosynthetic pathway, it is eventually converted to dihydrosanguinarine. The precursor to sanguinarine, dihydrosanguinarine is converted to the final toxin via the action of dihydrobenzophenanthridine oxidase.

See also 
 Berberine, a plant-derived compound having  a chemical classification similar to that of sanguinarine.
 Chelidonine

References 

Isoquinoline alkaloids
Quinoline alkaloids
Quaternary ammonium compounds
Alkaloids found in Papaveraceae
Toxins